Jeannine Marchand  (b. 1976, San Juan, Puerto Rico) is an American artist known for folded clay pieces. She attended Saint Joseph's University and the  Cranbrook Academy of Art. She is located in Spruce Pine, North Carolina. In 2014 she created the installation Jeannine Marchand: Con Relación al Espacio for the Latin American Contemporary Art (LaCa) Projects. Her work, FOLDS CLXVIII, was acquired by the Smithsonian American Art Museum as part of the Renwick Gallery's 50th Anniversary Campaign.

References

1976 births
Living people
Puerto Rican women
21st-century women artists